Migration 5 (M5, formerly the Five Country Conference on migration) is a conference of the immigration authorities of Australia, Canada, New Zealand, the United Kingdom, and the United States of America. The five countries work together to "enhance the integrity, security and efficiency of their immigration and border services" including the sharing of certain overseas visa application centres. In 2009, the Five Country Conference agreed to a data-sharing protocol which facilitates the sharing of the biometric data of up to 3000 people per year in order to assist with asylum applications.

The respective authorities are:
 : Department of Home Affairs
 : Immigration, Refugees and Citizenship Canada and the Canada Border Services Agency
 : Immigration New Zealand
 : Home Office
 : Department of Homeland Security

See also
 Anglosphere
 Border Five
 CANZUK
 Five Eyes
 Five Nations Passport Group

References

External links
 
 Five Country Conference  from Statewatch
 About 5CCW - Five Country Conference Watch
 From Insularity to Exteriority: How the Anglosphere is Shaping Global Governance – Centre for International Policy Studies

Anglosphere
Immigration services